The Abuna River is a river in South America. As a part of the Amazon Basin, it forms part of the border between northern Bolivia and north-western Brazil.

It originates in several streams east of the Cordillera Oriental of the Peruvian Andes. The river is navigable for circa  in its lower northeastern part. At Manoa it joins the Río Madeira, a tributary of the Amazon. Opposite the river mouth there is the town of Abunã on the Brazilian side of the confluence.

References

Rivers of Acre (state)
Rivers of Rondônia
Bolivia–Brazil border
International rivers of South America
Rivers of Pando Department
Border rivers